Plainview is an administrative division in eastern Metro Manila, the Philippines. It is an urban barangay in Mandaluyong and is home to the city's seat of government and government center. It is the fourth largest barangay in the city.

The area is named after the area's history as a plain where rice and corn were cultivated. It was originally developed as a private residential subdivision by real estate developer Ortigas, Madrigal and Company (now Ortigas and Company). The residential development was converted into a barangay, retaining its name.

History 
The area that would become known as Plainview was part of the original barrio of Hulo in the 1900s that also comprised the present-day barangays of Mauway and Malamig. Plainview was a private residential subdivision of Ortigas, Madrigal and Company (now Ortigas and Company), being named after the area's vast plains where rice and corn were cultivated. The area was also abundant in trees and was a popular spot for bird-hunting. After the development was transferred to the government, the area became known as Barangay Plainview. Its central junction, Maysilo Circle, developed as the Mandaluyong City Government Complex, moving from the original Mandaluyong municipal hall constructed in 1962 along Boni Avenue in present-day Barangay Poblacion.

Flooding issues 

The project became infamous for closing off San Francisco Street to traffic and for causing severe flooding even without the rains. Allegations of corruption were also raised due to the slow progress of the project, which was still not yet finished after two years of construction. The DPWH in February 2016 stated that the project was on schedule to be finished by May 2016. The street was reopened to the public on October 25, 2016, after the completion of the project.

Education 
 St. Therese Educational Private School
 Plainview Elementary School
 Holistic Educational Montessori Center 
 Curun Christian School, Inc.
 Angel's Institute of Learning (Pre-school to Grade 6)
 Rainbow Room Learning Center (Pre-school)
 Future Mind's Academy (Pre-school to Grade 6)

Landmarks 
 Dambana ng Ala-ala
 Archdiocesan Shrine of the Divine Mercy Church
 Mandaluyong City Hall

Government 
The seat of government of Plainview is located at 40 Malaya Street, near the Mandaluyong City Medical Center. The Mandaluyong City Government Complex is also within Plainview, housing the city's departments, the local office of the Commission on Elections, and the main offices of the Mandaluyong City Fire Department, Mandaluyong Postal Office, and the Mandaluyong Hall of Justice.

See also 
Administrative divisions of Metro Manila

References

Barangays of Metro Manila
Mandaluyong